1996 Urawa Red Diamonds season

Review and events

League results summary

League results by round

Competitions

Domestic results

J.League

Emperor's Cup

J.League Cup

Player statistics

 † player(s) joined the team after the opening of this season.

Transfers

In:

Out:

Transfers during the season

In
 Brian Steen Nielsen (loan from OB Odense on August)

Out

Awards

J.League Best XI:  Guido Buchwald,  Masayuki Okano

References

Other pages
 J. League official site
 Urawa Red Diamonds official site

Urawa Red Diamonds
Urawa Red Diamonds seasons